The men's 10,000 metres event at the 2006 Commonwealth Games was held on March 25.

Results

References
Results

10000
2006